Rich Barcelo (born July 12, 1975) is an American professional golfer who played on the PGA Tour and the Web.com Tour.

Barcelo played on the Nationwide Tour in 1999, 2002, 2003, 2005, and 2008-09. He was a member of the PGA Tour in 2004 and 2007. He qualified for the PGA Tour through qualifying school both times. He won his first tournament on a professional golf tour in 2009 at the Cox Classic on the Nationwide Tour. He finished 21st on the money list to earn his 2010 PGA Tour card.

Barcelo played in the 1986 Little League World Series as a member of the Tucson team that lost 12-0 to Taiwan in the finals. He married Teresa Barcelo in 2004. In 2005, he had his first daughter, Milan. And in 2008, he had his second daughter, Macy. His brother, Marc, played professional baseball in the minors leagues from 1993 to 1997, and is now head golf pro at Doral Golf Resort & Spa in Doral, Florida. Rich Barcelo now works as director of instruction at Bluejack National Golf Club in Montgomery, Texas.

Professional wins (2)

Nationwide Tour wins (1)

Other wins (1)
2000 California State Open

Results in major championships

Note: Barcelo never played in the Masters Tournament or the PGA Championship.

CUT = missed the half-way cut

See also
2003 PGA Tour Qualifying School graduates
2006 PGA Tour Qualifying School graduates
2009 Nationwide Tour graduates

External links

American male golfers
Nevada Wolf Pack men's golfers
PGA Tour golfers
Korn Ferry Tour graduates
Golfers from California
Sportspeople from Long Beach, California
1975 births
Living people